This is a list of players who have played at least one game for the New York Rangers of the National Hockey League (NHL) from 1926–27 to the most recent complete season.

As of the completion of the 2018–19 New York Rangers season, a total of 932 skaters and 84 goalies have played for the Rangers in the 92 full seasons since starting in the 1926–27 New York Rangers season.

Key
  Appeared in a Rangers game during the 2021–2022 season.
  Stanley Cup Champion or Hockey Hall of Famer.

The "Seasons" column lists the first year of the season of the player's first game and the last year of the season of the player's last game. For example, a player who played one game in the 2000–2001 season would be listed as playing with the team from 2000–2001, regardless of what calendar year the game occurred within.

Statistics complete as of the 2021–2022 NHL season.

Goaltenders

Skaters

References
http://hockeydb.com/ihdb/stats/ttotdisplay.php3?tid=48 hockeydb.com

New York Rangers
 
players